Grande means "large" or "great" in many of the Romance languages. It may also refer to:

Places 
Grande, Germany, a municipality in Germany
Grande Communications, a telecommunications firm based in Texas
Grande-Rivière (disambiguation)
Arroio Grande (disambiguation)
Boca grande (disambiguation)
Campo Grande (disambiguation)
El Grande, a German-style board game
Loma Grande (disambiguation)
Lucida Grande, a humanist sans-serif typeface
María Grande, a village and municipality in Entre Ríos Province in northeastern Argentina
Mojón Grande, a village and municipality in Misiones Province in northeastern Argentina
Playa Grande (disambiguation)
Ribeira Grande (disambiguation)
Rio Grande (disambiguation)
Salto Grande (disambiguation)
Valle Grande (disambiguation)
Várzea Grande (disambiguation)
Villa Grande (disambiguation)
Casa Grande Ruins National Monument
Casas Grandes
Mesa Grande
Pueblo Grande de Nevada
Pueblo Grande Ruin and Irrigation Sites
Campina Grande, city in Paraíba State, Brazil

People 

Grande (surname), a list of people with the surname

Other uses 

 Grande, the main antagonist in the anime series, Tweeny Witches

See also
 
 Grand (disambiguation)
 Grandis (disambiguation)
 Grandee, high aristocratic title Grande in Spain, Portugal and Brazil